Hu Ke is the name of:

 Hu Ke (actress) (born 1975), Chinese actress
 Hu Ke (cyclist) (born 1988), Chinese male track cyclist